Simone Rizzato (born 21 September 1981) is a retired Italian professional football player. He was the former captain of Reggina Calcio.

Career 
Rizzato made his debut in Serie C2 with Fano at the age of 17.

In July 2001 he moved to Vis Pesaro where he played for two seasons in Serie C1.

In July 2003 he was acquired by Torino where in a season and a half he played 30 matches in Serie B, before moving to Chievo Verona on loan, where he remained a few months without ever debuting in Serie A.

In August 2005 he was back in Serie B with Catanzaro and the following January he played once again in Serie C1 with Perugia.

In July 2006 he joined Ancona where he played for two seasons as a starter in Serie C1, after which obtained promotion to Serie B.

In July 2009 he was bought by Reggina and he played 40 matches in domestic league competitions. On the first match day of the 2011–12 Serie B season (Reggina–Modena) he scored his first goal with the amaranth jersey; the game ended in a 4–1 win for Reggina. In the same season he became team captain.

In June 2017, he joined Avellino.

After the 2018–19 season, 37-year old Rizzato decided to leave professional football and left Vis Pesaro to join ASD Atletico Gallo Colbordolo. In May 2022, he announced his retirement.

References

External links 

Simone Rizzato at TuttoCampo

1981 births
Living people
Italian footballers
Italian expatriate footballers
Sportspeople from the Province of Latina
Association football midfielders
People from Terracina
Footballers from Lazio
Alma Juventus Fano 1906 players
Vis Pesaro dal 1898 players
Torino F.C. players
A.C. ChievoVerona players
U.S. Catanzaro 1929 players
A.C. Perugia Calcio players
A.C. Ancona players
Reggina 1914 players
Trapani Calcio players
U.S. Avellino 1912 players
S.S. Virtus players
Serie B players
Serie C players
Eccellenza players
Italian expatriate sportspeople in San Marino
Expatriate footballers in San Marino